You Are There may refer to:
You Are There (Mono album), 2006
You Are There (Roberta Gambarini & Hank Jones album), 2007
You Are There (series), radio and television series
"You Are There", a song written by Johnny Mandel and Dave Frishberg